David Hilley (born 20 December 1938 in Glasgow) is a Scottish former footballer, who played for Third Lanark, Newcastle United and Nottingham Forest. After leaving Forest, Hilley emigrated to South Africa, where he continued his football career, later returning to live in Newcastle-upon-Tyne.

Hilley represented the Scottish League once, in 1959.

His elder brother Ian was also a footballer; they briefly played together at Third Lanark, including in the 1959 Scottish League Cup Final at Hampden Park. They had grown up in Mount Florida, the Glasgow suburb situated between Hampden and Thirds Cathkin Park stadium.

References

External links 

1938 births
Living people
Footballers from Glasgow
Association football inside forwards
Scottish footballers
Pollok F.C. players
Third Lanark A.C. players
Newcastle United F.C. players
Nottingham Forest F.C. players
Highlands Park F.C. players
Arcadia Shepherds F.C. players
Hellenic F.C. players
Hamilton Academical F.C. players
Scarborough F.C. players
South Shields F.C. (1974) players
Bedlington Terriers F.C. players
Scottish Football League players
English Football League players
Scottish expatriate footballers
Expatriate soccer players in South Africa
Scottish Football League representative players
Scotland under-23 international footballers
Scottish Junior Football Association players